"Mama Do the Hump" is the third official single taken from British hip hop duo Rizzle Kicks' debut studio album, Stereo Typical (2011). The single was released in the United Kingdom on 16 December 2011. The track was produced by Fatboy Slim. The song incorporates a sample of Craig McLachlan's 1990 cover of "Mona (I Need You Baby)", originally recorded by Bo Diddley and an interpolation of "Reunion" by Bobbie Gentry. It peaked at number two on the UK Singles Chart on 22 January 2012, held off the top spot by Jessie J's "Domino". It contains uncredited vocals from MNEK, who performs the chorus.

The song was the 17th best-selling single of 2012 in the UK with sales of 559,000 for the year. Also, the song has been used a lot in the media, for example in the adverts for American import sitcom Mom, as well as the adverts for the Chromecast.

Critical reception

Robert Copsey of Digital Spy gave the song a positive review stating: "Not that you'd guess from their casual and carefree attitude on the track. "I just want all of these girls to be on me, And maybe even one of them could be Beyoncé," they cheekily boast over a bounding guitar riff before engaging in some bump 'n' grind with their "Mama" on the dancefloor. The result is the Christmas party of songs - a proper knees-up that rarely fails to disappoint."

Music video
A music video to accompany the release of "Mama Do the Hump" was uploaded to YouTube on 29 November 2011, at a total length of four minutes and fifteen seconds. It was directed by Jordan 'Rizzle' Stephens and filmed by Jim Shreim. The video features Jordan's mother and aunt miming to the rapping. Eamonn Walker appears in the video and James Corden also makes a cameo appearance, arriving towards the end of the video at 3:07 and being let by the duo through the front door. He puts his coat down and then suddenly begins dancing to the chorus.

Track listings

Charts

Weekly charts

Year-end charts

Certifications

Release history

References

2011 singles
Island Records singles
Rizzle Kicks songs
Songs written by Norman Cook
2011 songs